Grzegorz Tkaczyk (born 22 December 1980 in Warsaw) is a retired Polish handball player - member of Poland men's national handball team, participant of 2007 World Men's Handball Championship.

Sporting achievements

State awards
 Golden Cross of Merit in 2007.

References

External links
 Player profile on Polish Handball Association  website
 Profile at Vive Targi Kielce official website

1980 births
Living people
Polish male handball players
Handball players at the 2008 Summer Olympics
Olympic handball players of Poland
Rhein-Neckar Löwen players
Vive Kielce players
Sportspeople from Warsaw